The following is a list of jPod episodes, a comedic CBC Canadian show based on Douglas Coupland's best-selling novel. It premiered on January 8, 2008, in its regular time slot of 9:00 P.M.

Episodes

Season 1

JPod